Yama Alou is the tenth album from Nawal Al Zoghbi. It was released in July 2006 and produced by Alam El Phan. It contains 13 songs in Lebanese, Egyptian and Gulf dialects.

Track listing

Music videos
 Rouhi Ya Rouhi August 7, 2005
 Shou Akhbarak January 16, 2006
 Yama Alou June 21, 2006
  Ady December 12, 2006 
  Aghla El Habayeb May 8, 2007
  Habbaytak November 15, 2007

Reception
Yama Alou album was a success in the Arab charts (specially Shou Akhbarak song), and reviews were good. LoneReviewer website wrote "Yama Alou is a good album from Nawal, and remains one of her most accomplished work thanks to Alam El Phan (Mazzika) production".

References

2006 albums
Arabic-language albums
Nawal Al Zoghbi albums